Chelmsford City racecourse, originally known as Great Leighs Racecourse, is a thoroughbred horse racing venue located in Great Leighs near Chelmsford, Essex, England. When it opened in April 2008, it was the first entirely new racecourse in the UK since Taunton opened in 1927. It went into administration in January 2009, and racing did not resume until January 2015.

Chelmsford City (known as Great Leighs at the time) was developed and owned by entrepreneur John Holmes and his son, Jonathan. It aimed to exploit potentially the largest unserved market in British horseracing. Overall there is slightly more than one racecourse per million people in Great Britain, but there was no racecourse in Essex (population >1.6 million), in east London (formerly in part, part of Essex) or in the neighbouring county of Hertfordshire (population >1 million). The new course is only  from Newmarket, the largest racehorse training centre in Britain. The course is laid out as an  left-handed Polytrack oval, with a  home straight. The 10,000-capacity grandstand was used at the 2006 Ryder Cup.

Opening
Great Leighs racecourse was originally scheduled to open in October 2006, but the opening was deferred several times. On 20 March 2008, the racecourse announced that the opening fixture would be postponed to 20 April 2008, with the original opening date, 4 April 2008, being used a test day.

Eventually, on 20 April 2008, the racecourse staged its first race meeting before an invited audience, with the opening race being won by Temple of Thebes. The first meeting with full public admission took place on 28 May 2008. The venue attracted some praise for some of its racing facilities but considerable criticism for the incomplete state of its visitor facilities. Attendances failed to meet expectations.

Closure and suspension of racing
The course was placed into administration and its temporary racing licence revoked on 16 January 2009. In March 2009, the administrators announced that the two parties that had made bids for the course had failed to demonstrate that they had sufficient financial backing. The administrators stated that they would enter into negotiations with the main creditor, the Royal Bank of Scotland, to see whether it was willing to take ownership of the course, and contract out the management of its operations to an established racecourse operator.

The administrators subsequently made a deal with a local businessman, Terry Chambers, to lease the course to him for 18 months, but the course was unable to obtain a racing licence and was, therefore, ineligible to bid for fixtures for 2010.  In September 2009, the administrators announced that they had struck a deal for Chambers and Bill Gredley to buy the racecourse with the hope that racing could resume in 2011, but the deal fell through. In June 2010 the administrators announced that they had given up hope of selling the business as a going concern and had started discussions with the Royal Bank of Scotland to find an alternative use for the site.

In March 2011 it was reported that Andrew Tinkler, chief executive of Eddie Stobart Ltd, was in discussions with Royal Bank of Scotland about reopening the track as a racecourse.

The course was bought by MC Racetracks in November 2011, but in May 2012 the British Horseracing Authority (BHA) rejected a bid to host fixtures at Great Leighs in 2013 but said that the owners were "welcome to submit an application to be part of the 2014 fixture list". In January 2013 MC Racetracks announced that they would submit an application to the BHA to hold racing at the course in 2014 but in June 2013, the BHA announced that it had rejected the application for 2014 fixtures.

Late in 2013, it was reported that a syndicate headed by Betfred's proprietor, Fred Done, had bought the track and was, as 'Chelmsford City Racecourse', to seek BHA approval for 2015 fixtures. In April 2014, the BHA announced that Great Leighs could apply to host fixtures in 2015 but without a guarantee of an expansion of all-weather fixtures.

The BHA announced, in July 2014, that the course would be allocated 12 fixtures for racing in 2015, a figure  subsequently increased to 58 meetings when the 2015 fixture list was published. The BHA announced that the course would stage its reopening meeting on 11 January 2015.

Reopening
The course reopened for racing on 11 January 2015, with an invited crowd of 800 people present, with the full public reopening taking place on 22 January 2015. The first race was won by Tryster by a short head. On 27 December 2015, racing from Chelmsford City appeared on Channel 4 Racing for the first time following waterlogging at Chepstow and the abandonment of the Welsh Grand National. In January 2017 Chelmsford City announced plans to build a casino and develop a new turf course inside the existing all-weather track.

Notable races

See also
Horse racing in Great Britain

References

External links 
 

 
Horse racing venues in England
Sports venues in Essex
Sports venues completed in 2008
2008 establishments in England
Sport in Chelmsford
Great Leighs